David Tong is a professor of theoretical physics at DAMTP in Cambridge, a fellow of Trinity College, Cambridge, and joint recipient of the 2008 Adams Prize.  He was a postdoc at the MIT Center for Theoretical Physics and an adjunct professor at the Tata Institute of Fundamental Research (TIFR).  
He is currently also a Simons Investigator. His main research interest is in quantum field theory.

His most-cited paper, "DBI in the sky", provides a possible observational test of one mechanism for inflation in the very early universe.

Works
"Quantum Vortex Strings: A Review",
 
 
"An Open-Closed String Duality in Field Theory?", Continuous Advances in QCD 2006, Editors M. Peloso, M. Shifman, World Scientific, 2007,

References

External links
 

Living people
British physicists
Fellows of Trinity College, Cambridge
Year of birth missing (living people)
Cambridge mathematicians
MIT Center for Theoretical Physics alumni